Novobiktovo (Yañı Beyektaw) is a rural locality (a selo) in Takarlikovsky Selsoviet, Dyurtyulinsky District, Bashkortostan, Russia. The population was 553 as of 2010. There are 12 streets.

Geography 
Novobiktovo is located 11 km north of Dyurtyuli (the district's administrative centre) by road. Veyalochnaya is the nearest rural locality.

References 

Rural localities in Dyurtyulinsky District